GardaWorld Corporation is a Canadian private security firm, headquartered in Montreal, Quebec, with 120,000 employees as of January 2022.

GardaWorld International Protective Services, the international division of the company, began operations in 1984. GardaWorld Security Corporation was established as Trans-Québec Security Inc. by Stéphan Crétier in 1995, who invested initially $25,000. The company runs physical security guard services and armoured car services globally.

History
During the mid-2000s, GardaWorld had a number of acquisitions, the one of which was a $391 million deal for Californian security-oriented firm ATI Systems International Inc. in which GardaWorld ended up suing ATI’s former CEO for allegedly misrepresenting its financial situation, while the CEO sued for wrongful dismissal.

On June 3, 2009 GardaWorld announced the sale of its U.S. and Mexico guarding operations to Andrews International for a total cash consideration of US$44.25 million, following a particularly poor financial performance the previous year; in mid-2008, GardaWorld’s stock fell by more than 90%. Debt restructuring followed and the company was left afloat, but looking weak in the eyes of its investors. Over the next few years, the results gradually improved and this was attributed to high demand for services in the Middle East and Afghanistan.

GardaWorld resumed making acquisitions, which drove its debt to $639 million, 4.2 times that of its operating profit (as of September 7, 2012). This has prompted owner Stéphan Crétier to lead a buyout of his firm and he has revealed plans with a British private equity firm, Apax Partners, that could result in a $300 million ownership division of the company.

On July 13, 2015, GardaWorld announced the acquisition of Aegis Defence Services to expand in Africa and the Middle East. The acquisition was completed on 12 October 2015 for $130,725,000 plus an earnout amount.

Rhône acquired the business in 2017 alongside Crétier and some members of management from Apax Partners in a deal valued at $2.2 billion. Apax originally took the company private in 2012 for about C$1.1 billion.

Incidents

2020 investigation into armored truck crashes and deaths

A March 1, 2020 article by the Tampa Bay Times found the company engaged in a decade of dangerous behavior and its trucks frequently causes crashes: "At least 19 people have been killed in Garda crashes since 2008, three in 2019 alone." Based in part on a former employee's documents and data (which GardaWorld has unsuccessfully argued was stolen from the company) and then used unsuccessfully in two dismissed lawsuits  and 90 interviews, 56 of them being current or former drivers, the article shows that Garda trucks frequently lacked reliable brakes, seat belts and sometimes even seats. The article also documents that drivers often received barely any training and said they were pressured to work long hours, even after repeated crashes. 

The GardaWorld database showed that during one period there were over 100 crashes on average monthly and that over a two and half year period over 320 people were injured. Additionally, the former employee alleges that GardaWorld offered to pay her to buy her silence, but that she chose not to accept money because: "I know I made the right decision by not accepting the money or signing a release. I believed in the truth prevailing - and am grateful to be able to share my story to help others."

2021 Fall of Kabul
During the Fall of Kabul (2021), on 19 August, The Guardian reported that the 125 guards of the Embassy of the United Kingdom, Kabul employed by GardaWorld would not be offered asylum in the UK. They were told that they were not eligible because they “were not directly employed by her majesty’s government”.  Meanwhile, over 100 guards of the Embassy of the United States, Kabul under a separate GardaWorld contract have been evacuated by the US.

On August 27, it was reported that GardaWorld gathered 185 families who worked for the embassy, 1000 people in total, in a failed attempt to evacuate them.  GardaWorld committed to further attempts "once things calm down in the coming months."

References

External links 

Companies formerly listed on the Toronto Stock Exchange
Companies based in Montreal
Security companies of Canada
Security companies of the United States